Nicholas Battaiola (born 21 August 1996) is an Italian footballer who plays as a goalkeeper for  club Fiorenzuola.

Club career
On 1 July 2019, he signed with Fiorenzuola.

Honours

Club 
 Monza
Serie D: 2016-17
Scudetto Dilettanti: 2016-17
 Fiorenzuola
Serie D: 2020-21

References

External links

1996 births
Living people
Sportspeople from Cremona
Footballers from Lombardy
Italian footballers
Association football goalkeepers
Serie C players
Serie D players
U.S. Cremonese players
A.C. Monza players
Virtus Francavilla Calcio players
A.S. Gubbio 1910 players
U.S. Fiorenzuola 1922 S.S. players